Vincenzo Cuccia (20 March 1892 – 2 March 1979) was an Italian fencer. He won a gold and bronze medal at the 1924 Summer Olympics.

References

External links
 

1892 births
1979 deaths
Italian male fencers
Olympic fencers of Italy
Fencers at the 1924 Summer Olympics
Olympic gold medalists for Italy
Olympic bronze medalists for Italy
Olympic medalists in fencing
Sportspeople from Palermo
Medalists at the 1924 Summer Olympics
20th-century Italian people